Dr. Death was one of the earliest United States dramatic TV series. Produced and broadcast in New York City, it was broadcast in 1945 on WNBT, and was a four-part thriller. It was one of the earliest mini-series produced for television, though not the first, as the BBC in the UK had transmitted Ann and Harold in 1938 (it is not known if there were any other mini-series prior to 1945, as early television series are poorly documented). The cast included Vinton Hayworth and Mary Patton.

Reception
Billboard magazine reviewed the second episode of the series with a fairly positive review, saying that "The four-part thriller was well-acted" but also commenting on some of the limitations of the production.

Episode status
As methods to record live television did not exist until late 1947, nothing remains of the series. It is not even known if any still photographs or scripts exist of the series.

References

External links

1940s American television miniseries
1945 American television series debuts
1945 American television series endings
1940s crime drama television series
American crime drama television series
American thriller television series
Black-and-white American television shows
English-language television shows
American live television series
Lost television shows
Television shows filmed in New York City